Poplar High Street is a street in Poplar and partly in Blackwall, Tower Hamlets, in the East End of London. Although the street became less used after 1860, it had previously been the principal street in Poplar.

Notable buildings on Poplar High Street
 New City College - Tower Hamlets
 Poplar Hospital
 St Matthias Old Church

References

Streets in the London Borough of Tower Hamlets
Poplar, London